Chedwin Park is a cricket ground in Spanish Town, Jamaica.

History
Chewdin Park was considered by 1970 to have the finest cricket pitch in Jamaica. The first representative match played on the ground came in the 1976–77 Gillette Cup in a List A one-day match between Jamaica and Trinidad and Tobago. Four years later the ground played host to two first-class cricket matches 1980–81 Shell Shield, with Jamaica playing Trinidad and Tobago and Barbados. A gap of 15 years followed before representative cricket returned to Chedwin Park, with the Leeward Islands playing Trinidad and Tobago in a one-day match in the 1996–97 Shell/Sandals Trophy. Between 1996 and 2005, Chedwin Park regularly played host to one-day matches in the Red Stripe Bowl; the 16th, and to date final, one-day match to be played at the ground was a tour match between Jamaica and the South Africans. First-class cricket returned to Chedwin Park in 1997, with Jamaica playing 11 further first-class matches there until 2011, predominantly in the Regional Four Day Competition, with the exception of a match against Ireland in 2010.

A murder took place at the ground in May 2010, which resulted in two police officers from the Jamaica Constabulary Force being charged with the murder of businessman Sheldon Daley.

Records

First-class
Highest team total: 522 for 9 declared by Jamaica v Barbados, 2004–05 
Lowest team total: 97 all out by Leeward Islands v Jamaica, 1996–97
Highest individual innings: 203 not out by Jimmy Adams for Jamaica v Trinidad and Tobago, 1997–98
Best bowling in an innings: 7-28 by Nikita Miller for Jamaica v Windward Islands, 2009–10
Best bowling in a match: 10-72 by Corey Collymore for Babardos v Jamaica, 2006–07

List A
Highest team total: 310 for 7 (50 overs) by Barbados v Saint Vincent and the Grenadines, 2002–03
Lowest team total: 62 all out (35.2 overs) by United States v Trinidad and Tobago, 2000–01
Highest individual innings: 122 by Chris Gayle for Jamaica v Rest of Leeward Islands, 2001–02
Best bowling in an innings: 4-15 by Mervyn Dillon for Jamaica v United States, 2000–01

See also
List of cricket grounds in the West Indies

References

External links
Chedwin Park at ESPNcricinfo

Cricket grounds in Jamaica